David Nazareno Bisconti (born 22 September 1968) is an Argentine former footballer who played 12 times for the Argentina national team.

Bisconti played the majority of his football for Rosario Central and Yokohama Marinos in Japan. He also played for CD Universidad Catolica in Chile CD Badajoz in Spain Gimnasia y Esgrima de Jujuy in Argentina, and two other Japanese teams; Avispa Fukuoka and Sagan Tosu.

Club statistics

National team statistics

References

External links
 

1968 births
Living people
Footballers from Rosario, Santa Fe
Argentine footballers
Argentine expatriate footballers
Argentina international footballers
Rosario Central footballers
Club Deportivo Universidad Católica footballers
Expatriate footballers in Chile
Gimnasia y Esgrima de Jujuy footballers
Yokohama F. Marinos players
Avispa Fukuoka players
Sagan Tosu players
Argentine Primera División players
J1 League players
J2 League players
Chilean Primera División players
Segunda División players
Expatriate footballers in Japan
CD Badajoz players
Expatriate footballers in Spain
Argentine expatriate sportspeople in Spain
Association football midfielders